Involve may refer to:

 Involve (think tank), The Involve Foundation, a UK-based organisation that focuses on public participation
 INVOLVE (UK National Advisory group), a UK national advisory Group that promotes public involvement in health and social care research
 Involve, a Journal of Mathematics